The genus Coronilla contains 8 species of flowering plants native to Europe and North Africa. It cointained about 20 species before being split into Securigera.

Species include:

 Coronilla coronata
 Coronilla juncea
 Coronilla minima
 Coronilla ramosissima
 Coronilla repanda
 Coronilla scorpioides
 Coronilla vaginalis
 Coronilla valentina

Species that were part of the genus include:

 Securigera elegans
 Securigera orientalis
 Securigera varia L. (crown vetch)

See also 
 Securigera, a segregate genus of Coronilla

References

External links 
 
 
 Coronilla at Tropicos

 
Fabaceae genera